Julia Kay Gaffney (born May 1, 2000) is an American Paralympic swimmer who competes in international level events. She was born with proximal femoral focal deficiency and had her right leg with amputated above the knee and her left leg amputated below the knee due to fibular hemimelia when she was born.

Gaffney was brought up in a Russian orphanage before being adopted by an American family from Arkansas when she was five years old.

Sporting career
Gaffney wanted to play softball but due to her disability circumstances she found it too difficult, she was then encouraged to take swimming lessons and she started competing in 2014. Her first international debut in competitive swimming was in California at the World Para Swimming World Series, she met her idol Jessica Long and Paralympic swimming coach Queenie Nichols who both inspired and influenced her to continue her swimming efforts.

At the 2017 World Para Swimming Championships in Mexico City, Gaffney won her first medals in the pool: five silver medals. In London, two years later at the 2019 World Para Swimming Championships, Gaffney became a world champion in the women's 200m individual medley SM7 where she was 0.02 seconds ahead of defending champion Tess Routliffe and Mallory Weggemann.

On April 14, 2022, Gaffney was named to the roster to represent the United States at the 2022 World Para Swimming Championships.

References

2000 births
Living people
Sportspeople from Little Rock, Arkansas
Paralympic swimmers of the United States
Medalists at the World Para Swimming Championships
People from Faulkner County, Arkansas
Swimmers at the 2020 Summer Paralympics
Medalists at the 2020 Summer Paralympics
Paralympic medalists in swimming
Paralympic bronze medalists for the United States
American female freestyle swimmers
American female backstroke swimmers
American female breaststroke swimmers
American female butterfly swimmers
American female medley swimmers
S7-classified Paralympic swimmers
21st-century American women